Highland is an unincorporated community in Helt Township, Vermillion County, in the U.S. state of Indiana.

History
Highland was probably so named on account of its lofty elevation. A post office was established at Highland in 1838, and remained in operation until 1868. With the construction of the railroad, business activity shifted to nearby Hillsdale, and the town of Highland declined.

Geography
Highland is located at  (39.794444, -87.395556), one mile west of the Wabash River and the Parke County town of Montezuma, and less than a mile northwest of Hillsdale.

References

Unincorporated communities in Vermillion County, Indiana
Unincorporated communities in Indiana
Terre Haute metropolitan area